The 1876 United States presidential election in Oregon took place on November 7, 1876, as part of the 1876 United States presidential election. Voters chose three representatives, or electors to the Electoral College, who voted for president and vice president.

Oregon voted for the Republican nominee, Rutherford B. Hayes, over the Democratic nominee, Samuel J. Tilden. Hayes won the state by a narrow margin of 3.54%.

Results

See also
 United States presidential elections in Oregon

References

Oregon
1876
1876 Oregon elections